Géza Kalocsay (30 May 1913 – 26 September 2008) was a footballer and manager from Hungary, who played internationally for both Czechoslovakia (3 caps) and Hungary (2 caps).

At the time of his death in September 2008 at the age of 95, he was the last surviving player to have represented either Czechoslovakia or Hungary before the Second World War.

Club career
He played for several clubs in the Hungarian championship namely Kispest FC, Ferencvárosi TC, Újpest FC, Ungvár and Szentlőrinci AC.

International career
He made two appearances for Hungarian national team.

In popular culture
In the Polish film Stars from 2017, he was portrayed by Witold Paszt.

Honours
Ferencváros
Nemzeti Bajnokság I: 1940–41

References

External links
 Újpest FC official site
 Profile on Czech federation official site
 Profile
 Profile
 Géza Kalocsay's obituary 

1913 births
2008 deaths
People from Berehove
People from the Kingdom of Hungary
Association football forwards
Hungarian footballers
Czechoslovak footballers
Czechoslovakia international footballers
Hungary international footballers
AC Sparta Prague players
Újpest FC players
Ligue 1 players
1934 FIFA World Cup players
FK Partizan managers
Hungarian football managers
Fehérvár FC managers
Debreceni VSC managers
Ferencvárosi TC managers
Standard Liège managers
Újpest FC managers
Górnik Zabrze managers
Dual internationalists (football)
Expatriate footballers in France
Expatriate football managers in Belgium
Expatriate football managers in Egypt
Hungarian expatriate sportspeople in Poland
Expatriate football managers in Poland
Expatriate football managers in Yugoslavia
Hungarians in Slovakia
Czechoslovak people of Hungarian descent
Al Ahly SC managers
Pécsi MFC managers
Pakistan national football team managers
Olympique Lillois players
Nemzeti Bajnokság I managers
Hungarian expatriate sportspeople in Belgium
Hungarian expatriate sportspeople in Yugoslavia
Hungarian expatriate sportspeople in Pakistan
Expatriate football managers in Pakistan
Hungarian expatriate sportspeople in Algeria
Expatriate football managers in Algeria
Hungarian expatriate football managers
Czechoslovak expatriate sportspeople in France
Hungarian expatriate sportspeople in France
Hungarian expatriate footballers
Czechoslovak expatriate footballers